The Allomet Corporation is a privately owned company located in North Huntingdon, Pennsylvania that produces a line of patented powdered metal products known as EternAloy® Tough-Coated Hard Powders (TCHP).

History
The Allomet Corporation (formerly EnDurAloy) was founded in Savannah, GA in 1996 and incorporated in March 1998. In November 2002, Allomet Corporation moved its headquarters and manufacturing facilities from Savannah, GA, to its current location, a 10-acre site in North Huntingdon Township, Pennsylvania.

Tough Coated Hard Powders (TCHP)

Overview
The development of TCHP materials is rooted in the cemented carbide industry, and the majority of current TCHP materials encapsulate a ceramic or superhard “core” particle into a cemented carbide shell.  Thus, TCHP material applications are closely related to the typical wear applications of standard cemented carbides.

Characteristics
TCHP’s are produced through a proprietary powdered metal processing technology which has the ability to uniformly coat 2-50 micrometer-sized hard core refractory particles of any shape (spherical, block, random, etc.) with 50-500 nanometer-thin tough coatings. These “core” particles are first coated with an intermediate encapsulating layer of tungsten carbide (WC) followed by an outer encapsulating binder layer of cobalt (Co) or nickel (Ni), giving the powder its double shelled structure.

When sintered or applied using thermal spray methods, the tough outer layers chemically bond, forming a metal matrix in the sintered article or deposited coating, This hybrid material combines the high strength, heat resistance, and toughness of cemented carbides with the chemical and abrasion wear resistance of the harder core particles.

Current TCHP Grades
TCHP’s are currently being produced and sold in five main product categories (shown below):

Product Applications
Machine tools (inserts, end mills, drills, etc.)
Wire drawing dies
Oil and gas drilling tools
Industrial valve components 
Linings of pipes for transporting abrasive and corrosive materials
Linings of containers for abrasive and corrosive materials
Automotive engine components
Bearings 
Turbine components
Aircraft components

Awards
Wire and Cable Technology – Top Products of 2013 Award
Wire Association International – Silver Certificate Award in the General Division for 2013 a technical paper entitled "Improved Wire Quality with Advanced TCHP Dies"
Wire and Cable Technology – Top Products of 2009 Award

References

External links

Companies based in Westmoreland County, Pennsylvania
Manufacturing companies based in Pennsylvania
American companies established in 1998
1998 establishments in Georgia (U.S. state)